The Twilight Series is an annual road cycling race that takes place in the spring in Athens, Georgia, United States, since 1980. During the course of each Twilight weekend, competitive events in a variety of fields are staged, including BMX racing and trick contests, a Kids' Criterium, a mountain bike or 'Fat Tire' Criterium, and the climactic event of the weekend, the Twilight Criterium. The weekend event features amateur and professional races, with differing prizes for each.

The Twilight Criterium itself is the most publicized and highly anticipated of each Twilight weekend. It is a professional race that takes place on a 1 km (.621 mile) course in downtown Athens. The entire race requires cyclists to endure 80 km (49.71 miles) within just a few hours. The main criterium features cash prizes totaling more than $US10,000.

Past winners
Key:

Men's 80K

Women's 40K

References

External links

Tourist attractions in Athens, Georgia
Cycling in Georgia (U.S. state)
Recurring sporting events established in 1980
Cycle races in the United States
Men's road bicycle races
Women's road bicycle races
Sports in Athens, Georgia